Freaks of Nature is a studio album by Swedish all-female alternative metal band Drain STH, released on 29 June 1999. It was the band's second and final full-length album.

Track listing

Drain STH also recorded a new song that was included on Ozzfest Rock Pile Sampler 1999. The song was called "Down".

Personnel

Band members
Maria Sjöholm - vocals
Flavia Canel - guitar
Anna Kjellberg - bass
Martina Axén - drums, backing vocals

Additional musicians
Nico Elgstrand - acoustic guitar
Stefan Brisland-Ferner - strings on "I Wish ..."
Fleshquartet - strings on "I Will Follow"
Herbie Crichlow - vocals on "Simon Says"
Tony Iommi - Guitar on "Black"

Production
Ulf "Sank" Sandqvist - producer, arranger, engineer, loops and programming
Andrew Scarth - additional production, engineer
Max Martin - producer and arranger on "Simon Says", vocals arrangements on "Simon Says" and "Right Through You"
Stefan Glaumann - mixing
George Marino - mastering

References

Drain STH albums
1999 albums